For the senior hurling equivalent see: Leinster Senior Club Hurling Championship

The Leinster Intermediate Club Hurling Championship is an annual hurling tournament played between the county champions on intermediate level within the province of Leinster. The winners get to compete in the semi-final of the All-Ireland Intermediate Club Hurling Championship.

History
A fight broke out at the 2022 Leinster Intermediate Club Hurling Championship quarter-final match between Oulart–The Ballagh of Wexford and Naomh Barróg of Dublin at Parnell Park, first of all involving players and then spreading into the supporters in the stand. The Leinster GAA announced an investigation and An Garda Síochána gave a statement to RTÉ's This Week programme that it was aware of video footage of the incident had been uploaded to social media. Oulart–The Ballagh had been tipped to win the game but lost.

The Leinster Council proposed bans of up to a year for players and fines and/or proposed bans for spectators.

The saga then continued when eight players appealed their bans.

Teams

Qualification

2006 championship
The 2006 Intermediate championship featured teams from Westmeath, Wexford, Kildare, Wicklow, Meath and Kilkenny. Since 2007, all the counties mentioned except Kilkenny and Wexford are not represented in the Leinster Senior Club Hurling Championship and this gives these so-called weaker counties a chance to show their hurling skills in a major competition. The senior champions of these weaker counties are better able to compete at this level. With Clonkill of Westmeath winning  the Leinster Intermediate title and going on to capture the All-Ireland Intermediate Club Hurling Championship in 2007/08, the Westmeath champions have since participated in the Leinster Senior Championship, with noticeable results.

The following county's champions participated in the 2013 championship:

Intermediate champions:   Wexford, Kilkenny

Senior champions:         Wicklow,  Kildare,  Meath

Senior 'B' Champions:     Dublin, Laois

List of finals

Roll of honour

By county

See also
 Munster Intermediate Club Hurling Championship
 Connacht Intermediate Club Hurling Championship
 Ulster Intermediate Club Hurling Championship

References

External links
 2010 Championship results

 2